Don Paul (March 18, 1925 – November 8, 2014) was a professional American football linebacker who played for the Los Angeles Rams (1948–1955) in the  National Football League (NFL). He was selected to three Pro Bowls during his years with the Rams. 
He was inducted into the UCLA Athletic Hall of Fame in 1986. He was one of only two players to play in six UCLA-USC games during the World War II years.

After Paul's football career he joined up with Roy Harlow and established the Rams Horn restaurant. Later he and Harlow teamed up with former LA Ram great Bob Waterfield and The Voice of the Rams Bob Kelley and opened up the Pump Room restaurant. He died after an illness on November 8, 2014.

References

External links
Don Paul at Find a Grave

Paul was also an assistant coach for the Rams when Bob Waterfield was the head coach, the staff included Hampton Poole and Jim david

1925 births
2014 deaths
Sportspeople from Fresno, California
American football linebackers
UCLA Bruins football players
Los Angeles Rams players
Western Conference Pro Bowl players
National Football League announcers
Los Angeles Rams announcers
Burials at Forest Lawn Memorial Park (Hollywood Hills)